WNRC-LP (97.5 FM) is a radio station licensed to serve Dudley, Massachusetts.  The station is owned by Nichols College. It airs a college radio format, 24/7 in stereo.

The station was assigned the WNRC-LP call letters by the Federal Communications Commission on September 1, 2005. This low-power station replaces a 15-watt class-D "full power" FM station known as WNRC that had been licensed to Nichols College; that station is now WXRB.

References

External links
 WNRC-LP official website
 Nichols College
 

NRC-LP
NRC-LP
Mass media in Worcester County, Massachusetts
NRC-LP